Nuuk (formerly  ) is the capital and largest city of Greenland, an autonomous territory in the Kingdom of Denmark. Nuuk is the seat of government and the territory's largest cultural and economic center. The major cities from other countries closest to the capital are Iqaluit and St. John's in Canada and Reykjavík in Iceland. Nuuk contains a third of Greenland's population and its tallest building. Nuuk is also the seat of government for the Sermersooq municipality. In January 2021, it had a population of 18,800.

The city was founded in 1728 by the Dano-Norwegian missionary Hans Egede when he relocated from the earlier Hope Colony where he arrived in 1721. The governor Claus Paarss was part of the relocation. The new colony was placed at the Inuit settlement of Nûk and was named Godthaab ("Good Hope"). "Nuuk" is the Greenlandic word for "cape" and is commonly found in Greenlandic place names. It is so named because of its position at the end of the Nuup Kangerlua fjord on the eastern shore of the Labrador Sea. Its latitude, at 64°11' N, makes it the world's northernmost capital, only a few kilometres farther north than the Icelandic capital Reykjavík. When home rule was established in 1979, the authorization of place names was transferred to Greenlandic authorities, who subsequently preferred Greenlandic names over Danish ones. The name Godthåb mostly went out of use over the next two decades.

The campus of the University of Greenland, hosting Statistics Greenland and the main holdings of the Public and National Library of Greenland, are at the northern end of the district, near the road to Nuuk Airport.

History 

The site has a long history of habitation. The area around Nuuk was first occupied by the ancient, pre-Inuit, Paleo-Eskimo people of the Saqqaq culture as far back as 2200 BC when they lived in the area around the now abandoned settlement of Qoornoq. For a long time, it was occupied by the Dorset culture around the former settlement of Kangeq, but they disappeared from the Nuuk district before AD 1000. The Nuuk area was later inhabited by Viking explorers in the 10th century (Western Settlement), and shortly thereafter by Inuit peoples. Inuit and Norsemen both lived with little interaction in this area from about 1000 until the disappearance of the Norse settlement for uncertain reasons during the 15th century.

The city proper was founded as the fort of Godt-Haab in 1728 by the royal governor Claus Paarss, when he relocated the missionary and merchant Hans Egede's earlier Hope Colony from Kangeq Island to the mainland. At that time, Greenland was formally still a Norwegian colony (until 1814) under the united Dano-Norwegian Crown, but the colony had not had any contact for over three centuries. Paarss's colonists consisted of mutinous soldiers, convicts, and prostitutes and most died within the first year of scurvy and other ailments. In 1733 and 1734, a smallpox epidemic killed most of the native population as well as Egede's wife. Hans Egede went back to Denmark in 1736 after 15 years in Greenland, leaving his son Poul to continue his work. Godthaab became the seat of government for the Danish colony of South Greenland, while Godhavn (modern Qeqertarsuaq) was the capital of North Greenland until 1940, when the administration was unified in Godthaab.

In 1733, Moravian missionaries received permission to begin a mission on the island; in 1747, there were enough converts to prompt the construction of the Moravian Brethren Mission House and the formal establishment of the mission as New Herrnhut. This became the nucleus for present-day Nuuk as many Greenlanders from the southeastern coast left their territory to live at the mission station. From this base, further missions were established at Lichtenfels (1748), Lichtenau (1774), Friedrichsthal (1824), Umanak (1861), and Idlorpait (1864), before they were discontinued in 1900 and folded into the Lutheran Church of Denmark.

Around 1850, Greenland, and especially the area around Nuuk, were in crisis. The Europeans had brought diseases and a culture that conflicted with the ways of the native Greenlanders. Many Greenlanders were living in poverty. In 1853, Hinrich Johannes Rink came to Greenland and was surprised at how local Greenlandic culture and identity had been suppressed under Danish influence. In response, in 1861, he started the Atuagagdliutt, Greenland's first newspaper, with a native Greenlander as editor. This newspaper based in Nuuk later became an important token of Greenlandic identity.

During World War II, there was a reawakening of Greenlandic national identity. The use of written Greenlandic grew, a council was assembled under Eske Brun's leadership in Nuuk. In 1940, an American and a Canadian Consulate were established in Nuuk. 

Under new regulations in 1950, two councils amalgamated into one. This Countryside Council was abolished on 1 May 1979, when the city of Godthåb was renamed Nuuk by the Greenland Home Rule government. The city boomed during the 1950s when Denmark began to modernize Greenland. As in Greenland as a whole, Nuuk is populated today by both Inuit and Danes. Over a third of Greenland's total population lives in the Nuuk Greater Metropolitan area.

An article examining indigenous influences on cities worldwide suggested,

Geography 

The mountain has given its name to the nationwide newspaper Sermitsiaq. Closer to the town are the peaks of Store Malene, and Lille Malene, . The magnetic declination at Nuuk is extreme.

Climate
Nuuk has a maritime-influenced tundra climate (Köppen ET) with cold, long, snowy winters and cool, short summers. Although the winters in Nuuk are relatively cold, they are milder compared to other tundra climates, such as in Alaska in the United States or parts of Eastern Siberia. Instead, peak winter is similar to identical latitudes in the Nordic countries. On 21 December, the shortest day and longest night of the year, the sun rises at 10:30 am and sets at 2:20 pm. By contrast, on the longest day and shortest night of the year, 21 June, the sun rises at 2:54 am and does not set until 12:04 am, giving a quasi-Midnight Sun. The record wind in Nuuk is 68 km/h.

The average monthly temperature ( in August) is colder than what is considered the limit for trees ( during the warmest month). There are a few planted trees which do not sustain well.

Demographics 
With 18,800 inhabitants as of January 2021, Nuuk is by far the largest town in Greenland. The population of Nuuk has doubled since 1977, increased by over a third since 1990, and risen by almost 21% since 2000. In addition to those born in Greenland, data from 2015 showed 3,826 were born outside the country. Attracted by good employment opportunities with high wages, Danes have continued to settle in the town. Today, Nuuk has the highest proportion of Danes of any town in Greenland. Half of Greenland's immigrants live in Nuuk, which also accounts for a quarter of the country's native population.

Government 
As the capital of Greenland, Nuuk is the administrative center of the country, containing all of the important government buildings and institutions. The public sector bodies are also the town's largest employer.

As of January 2021, the mayor of Nuuk is Charlotte Ludvigsen. She replaced former mayor Asii Chemnitz Narup in 2019 following a social media scandal involving posts criticizing her party. Like Narup, Ludvigsen is a member of the Inuit Ataqatigiit party.

Greenland's self-government parliament, the Inatsisartut, is in Nuuk. It has 31 seats and its members are elected by popular vote on the basis of proportional representation to serve four-year terms. All of Greenland's major political parties have their headquarters in Nuuk, including the Inuit Ataqatigiit, Siumut, Democrats, Atassut, Association of Candidates and the Women's Party.

KANUKOKA 

KANUKOKA was based in Nuuk. It was an association of Greenland's municipalities, led by Enok Sandgreen. The aim of the organisation was to facilitate cooperation among all five municipalities of Greenland: Avannaata, Kujalleq, Qeqertalik, Qeqqata, and Sermersooq. However, Sermersooq and Qeqertalik both withdrew and KANUKOKA was dissolved as of Tuesday, 31 July 2018. The organisation ran the municipal elections every four years, with the last election taking place in 2016. All municipal authorities in Greenland were members of the organisation up until its 2018 dissolution. The association was overseen by Maliina Abelsen, the Minister for Social Affairs in the Government of Greenland.

Economy 

Although only a small town, Nuuk has developed trade, business, shipping and other industries. It began as a small fishing settlement with a harbor, but as the economy developed rapidly during the 1970s and 1980s, the fishing industry in the capital declined. The port is nevertheless still home to almost half of Greenland's fishing fleet. The local Royal Greenland processing plant absorbs landed seafood amounting to over DKK 50 million (US$7 million) per annum, mainly (80%) shrimp, but also cod, lumpfish and halibut. Seafood, including seal, is also sold in abundance in Nuuk's fish markets, the largest being Kalaaliaraq Market. Minerals including zinc and gold have contributed to the development of Nuuk's economy.

The city, like much of Greenland, is heavily dependent upon Danish investment and relies on Denmark for block funding.

Energy 
All of Greenland's electricity is supplied by the government-owned company Nukissiorfiit, which has a monopoly on the electricity in Greenland.

Education 

Nuuk has several educational institutions of higher learning. The University of Greenland (Ilisimatusarfik), the only university in Greenland, is in Nuuk. The university was founded in 1987 and expanded in 2007 with the new building, Ilimmarfik, housing departments of journalism, management and economics, language, literature and media, cultural and social history, theology and religion and social work. Nuuk is also home to the Department of Learning (Ilinniarfissuaq), the oldest educational facility in Greenland, in the old colonial part of Nuuk (Nuutoqaq: Old Nuuk). Other notable educational institutions include the Department of Nursing and Health Science, Nuuk Technical College and the Iron & Metal School.

Healthcare 
The city is served by Queen Ingrid's Hospital. The hospital not only serves as the main hospital for the municipality but is the central hospital in all of Greenland. The hospital has 185 beds.

Tourism 
The Nuuk Tourist Office was built in 1992 to house the headquarters of the new National Tourist Board of Greenland.

Shopping 
Shops in Nuuk offer local art and craftwork. In July 2012, Greenland's first shopping center, Nuuk Center (NC), opened. The center has Greenland's first underground parking. Several supermarkets exist, such as Nuuk Center, Pisiffik, Brugseni, and Spar.

Transportation

Airport 

Nuuk has an international airport  to the northeast of the town center. Built in 1979, it is a hub for Air Greenland, which is also headquartered in Nuuk and operates its technical base at the airport. There are flights inside Greenland and to Iceland. A decision has been made to extend the runway to allow for flights to European destinations, such as Denmark.

Sea 
As a result of the high cost of flying goods to Greenland, Nuuk and other towns in Greenland are connected to Denmark by cargo vessels which sail mainly from Aalborg during the warmer months after the winter ice has melted. They bring clothing, flour, medicine, timber and machinery and return with deep-frozen shrimp and fish. For most of the year, Nuuk is served twice-weekly by the coastal ferry of the Arctic Umiaq Line, which links the communities of the western coast.

Roadways 

The majority of buses and cars owned in Greenland operate in Nuuk. There are no roads connecting Nuuk with other areas of Greenland. The main street in Nuuk is Aqqusinersuaq, with a number of shops and the 140-room Hotel Hans Egede.

Since 2009, the city bus service Nuup Bussii provides city transport services in Nuuk for the Sermersooq municipality, linking the town center with the airport, the outlying districts and neighborhoods of Nuussuaq, Qinngorput, as well as Qernertunnguit in Quassussuup Tungaa. In 2012, the buses transported more than 2 million passengers around the city of Nuuk.

Cityscape

Historical buildings 

Hans Egede's House
Hans Egede's House, built in 1721 by the Norwegian missionary Hans Egede, is the oldest building in Greenland. Standing close to the harbor among other old houses, it is now used for government receptions.

Nuuk Cathedral
The Church of Our Saviour of the Lutheran diocese of Greenland was built in 1849, and the tower was added in 1884. The red building with a clock tower and steeple is a prominent site on the landscape. The church received the status of Nuuk Cathedral in 1994, when the first bishop was Kristian Mørk, followed in 1995 by Sofie Petersen, a native of Greenland and the second woman in Denmark to become a bishop.

The Herrnhut House was the center of the Moravian mission of New Herrnhut. Other landmarks include the Hans Egede Church and the Statue of Hans Egede.

National Museum
Greenland National Museum is in Nuuk and was one of the first museums established in Greenland, inaugurated in the mid-1960s. The museum has many artifacts and exhibits related to Greenland's archaeology, history, art, and handicrafts, and contains the Qilakitsoq mummies.

Cultural 

Katuaq is a cultural center used for concerts, films, art exhibitions, and conferences. It was designed by Schmidt Hammer Lassen and inaugurated on 15 February 1997. Katuaq contains two auditoria, the larger seating 1,008 people and the smaller, 508. The complex also contains an art school, library, meeting facilities, administrative offices and a café.

The Nuuk Art Museum is the only private art and crafts museum in Greenland. The museum contains a notable collection of local paintings, watercolors, drawings, and graphics, some by Andy Warhol; and figures in soapstone, ivory, and wood, with many items collected by archaeologists.

Educational 

Ilisimatusarfik, the University of Greenland, is in Nuuk and is the national university of Greenland. Most courses are taught in Danish, although a few are in Kalaallisut as well. , the university had approximately 150 students (almost all Greenlanders), around 14 academic staff, and five administrators. Its library holds approximately 30,000 volumes.

The National Library of Greenland in Nuuk is the largest reference library in the country, devoted to the preservation of Greenland's cultural heritage and history. The library holdings are split between the public library in the town center and Ilimmarfik, the campus of the University of Greenland. As of 1 January 2008, there are 83,324 items in the library database at Ilimmarfik.

Sports 

Nuuk's sports clubs include Nuuk IL (established in 1934), B-67, and GSS Nuuk. Nuuk Stadium is a multi-purpose stadium, used mostly for football games. The stadium has a capacity of 2,000. The stadium can also be used as an entertainment venue: the Scottish rock band Nazareth performed at the venue. Nuuk also has the Godthåbhallen, a handball stadium. It is the home of the Greenland men's national handball team and has a capacity of 1,000. There is a hill for alpine skiing with an altitude difference around 300 meters on the mountain Lille Malene, with the valley station close to the airport terminal. There is also the Nuuk golf course, the only  arctic golf course in the world.

Notable people 
 Maliina Abelsen, Greenland's Minister for Social Affairs
 Agnethe Davidsen, Greenland's first female government minister
 Jesper Grønkjær, footballer
 Bo Lidegaard, historian
 Nils Nielsen, Football manager. Head coach for the Switzerland national women's team.
 Minik Thorleif Rosing, geologist.

International relations

Twin towns and sister cities 
Nuuk is twinned with:

See also 
 Coat of Arms of Nuuk
 Sisimiut, the second-largest city in Greenland

References

External links 

. Visitgreenland.com.

 
Capitals in North America
Cities and towns in Greenland
Populated coastal places in Greenland
Populated places established in 1728
Populated places in Greenland
Port cities and towns in Greenland
Capitals in Europe
1728 establishments in North America
Road-inaccessible communities of North America